Éric Laporte (born January 24, 1976 in Montreal, Quebec) is a politician from Quebec, Canada. He was an Action démocratique du Québec Member of the National Assembly for the electoral district of L'Assomption from 2007 to 2008.

He worked as an agent at the National Bank in Montreal and Industrielle Alliance in Charlemagne. He was also a member of the Terrebonne Chamber of Commerce as well as the vice-president of the international student association in economic and commercial sciences at the UQAM.

He was first elected in the 2007 election with 39% of the vote. Parti Québécois incumbent Jean-Claude St-André finished second with 34% of the vote.  Laporte took office on April 12, 2007.

Footnotes

External links
 

1976 births
Action démocratique du Québec MNAs
Living people
Université du Québec à Montréal alumni
Politicians from Montreal
21st-century Canadian politicians